The Soya-Mixed Meat Museum is a food museum in Benjhou Industrial Park, Gangshan District, Kaohsiung, Taiwan.

Exhibitions
The museum offers detailed information to the history and culture of marinated food, sea food and agriculture produces.

Transportation
The museum is accessible north of Gangshan Station of Taiwan Railways.

See also
 List of museums in Taiwan

References

External links
 

Food museums in Taiwan
Museums in Kaohsiung